Sugar Time! was a television comedy series produced by James Komack. The show was about an aspiring female rock group. Barbi Benton starred as Maxx Douglass, a hatcheck girl as well as the lead of an all-female rock band trying to break into the music business. The show also starred Marianne Black and Didi Carr.

Cast
 Barbi Benton as Maxx Douglas, a hatcheck girl and member of the rock band Sugar.
 Marianne Black as Maggie Barton, a dental hygienist and member of Sugar.
 Didi Carr as Diane Zuckerman, a dance instructor and member of Sugar.
 Wynn Irwin as Al Marks, owner of The Tryout Room, the nightclub in which Sugar performed gratis.

Episodes

Season 1 (1977)

References

External links
 

1977 American television series debuts
1978 American television series endings
1970s American musical comedy television series
1970s American sitcoms
American Broadcasting Company original programming
English-language television shows